Constantine II (Konstantin II Asen), allegedly ruled as emperor (tsar) of Bulgaria from 1397 to 1422. He was born in the early 1370s, and died in exile at the Serbian court on 17 September 1422. Constantine II claimed the title Emperor of Bulgaria and was accepted as such by foreign governments, but he is often omitted from listings of rulers of Bulgaria.

Life
Constantine II Asen was the son of Ivan Sratsimir (Ivan Sracimir) of Bulgaria by Anna, daughter of prince Nicolae Alexandru of Wallachia. He was crowned co-emperor by his father in or before 1395, when he was sent on a mission to the old Bulgarian capital Tărnovo.

Very little is known about Constantine II's circumstances after his father's arrest and imprisonment by Sultan Bayezid I in 1396. At that time, Ivan Stratsimir was contributing with soldiers to assist the Christian nations' bid to resist the advance of the Ottoman Empire. Following the Battle of Nicopolis, Vidin finally fell under the sphere of the Ottomans led by Bayezid I.

Some Bulgarian historians suppose that Tsardom of Vidin's most western territories may have remained under Constantine II's rule almost until his death in 1422. Together with his cousin Fruzhin (Fružin), a son of Ivan Shishman (Ivan Šišman), Constantine II took advantage of the Ottoman Interregnum to raise an anti-Ottoman revolt in northwestern Bulgaria. Constantine II was also allied to the Serbian despot Stefan Lazarević and the Wallachian voivode Mircea I. The anti-Ottoman rebellion lasted for half a decade (1408–1413) and spread to much of Bulgaria until the rebels were defeated by the Ottoman Sultan Musa.

The Bulgarians attempted to make up for their losses by siding with Musa's brother and rival Sultan Mehmed I, but the latter's victory did little to improve their situation. After Mehmed I's victory in 1413, Constantine II spent much of his life in Hungary and Serbia. His last possessions in Bulgaria were annexed in 1422, and shortly afterwards Constantine II died at the Serbian court on September 17, 1422.

Constantine II was the last emperor of Bulgaria, and his dispossession and death in 1422 marks the end of the Second Bulgarian Empire. The Ottoman conquest had begun in earnest half a century earlier, in 1369, and their rule lasted until 1878.

Honours
Konstantin Buttress on Nordenskjöld Coast in Graham Land, Antarctica is named after Constantine II of Bulgaria.

Notes

References
 John V.A. Fine, Jr., The Late Medieval Balkans, Ann Arbor, 1987.
 Ivan Tjutjundžiev and Plamen Pavlov, Bălgarskata dăržava i osmanskata ekspanzija 1369–1422, Veliko Tărnovo, 1992.

External links
 Detailed list of Bulgarian rulers

1370s births
1422 deaths
14th-century Bulgarian emperors
15th-century Bulgarian emperors
Eastern Orthodox monarchs
People from Vidin
Sratsimir dynasty
Tsardom of Vidin
Sons of emperors